was a politician and cabinet minister in the pre-war Empire of Japan.

Ōishi was a native of Tosa Province (modern-day Kōchi Prefecture), where his father was a samurai in the service of Tosa Domain. In 1873, he joined with Itagaki Taisuke and became an important member of the Freedom and People's Rights Movement. He became one of the leaders of the Jiyūtō political party in 1881. However, he had a falling out with Itagaki in 1882 and left the party. He subsequently joined with Gotō Shōjirō’s daidō danketsu (coalition) movement in 1887. In 1892, he was appointed to the Japanese legation in Seoul, Korea. He was back in Japan by 1896, and was one of the founding members of the Shimpotō political party. Under the short-lived 1st Ōkuma Shigenobu administration in 1898, Oishi was appointed Minister of Agriculture and Commerce.

Ōishi later joined the Rikken Kokumintō and was at one point a contender against Inukai Tsuyoshi for its leadership. In 1913, he broke with Inukai, and joined Katsura Tarō’s new Rikken Dōshikai, where he was ranked as one of its five leaders. He retired from politics in 1915, after having been elected to the Lower House of the Diet of Japan for six terms.

 

1855 births
1935 deaths
People from Kōchi Prefecture
Government ministers of Japan
Members of the House of Representatives (Empire of Japan)
Shimpotō politicians
Liberal Party (Japan, 1881) politicians
Rikken Kokumintō politicians
Rikken Dōshikai politicians